Chizhik may refer to:

Chizhik-Pyzhik
Dmitry Chizhik, American engineer
Leonid Chizhik, Soviet musician